Salaspils camp was established at the end of 1941 at a point  southeast of Riga (Latvia), in Salaspils.  The Nazi bureaucracy drew distinctions between different types of camps.  Officially, it was the Salaspils Police Prison and Re-Education Through Labor Camp (Polizeigefängnis und Arbeitserziehungslager).  It was also known as camp Kurtenhof after the German name for the city of Salaspils. 

Planning for the development of the camp and its prisoner structure changed several times. In 1943, Heinrich Himmler briefly considered converting the camp into an official concentration camp (Konzentrationslager), which would have formally subordinated the camp to the National Security Main Office (Reichssicherheitshauptamt or RSHA), but nothing came of this. The camp has had a lasting legacy in Latvian and Russian culture due to the severity of the treatment at the camp, especially with regard to children.

Original plan
In October 1941, SS-Sturmbannführer Rudolf Lange began planning a detention camp to be built at Salaspils to confine people arrested in Latvia by the police and also to house Jewish people deported from Germany and other countries to Latvia.  Lange, who originally was the coordinator of Special Assignment Group A (Einsatzgruppe A), a mobile squad of killers, started a new job in December 1941 as commander of both the security police (Sicherheitspolizei) in Latvia and also of the Security Service (Sicherheitsdienst).  The place selected, near the city of Salaspils, was readily accessible from the main railway connecting Riga and Daugavpils, the two largest cities in Latvia.  The plan was to work the prisoners harvesting peat and also, as part of what soon became known as the Final Solution, to separate Jewish men from Jewish women to prevent them from having children. In February 1942 Lange, probably because of his deeds in Latvia, became a participant in the Wannsee Conference where the final plans for the murder of the Jews of Europe were established by the Nazi hierarchy.

Camp construction and changes of plan

The first rail transport of German Jews arrived unexpectedly in Latvia in October 1941 before the Salaspils camp was complete. The train had been rerouted from its original destination of Minsk to Riga. The Jewish people on the train were housed temporarily in Jungfernhof concentration camp ("KZ Jungfernhof") or a little later in a Nazi-delineated part of Riga, which later became known as the Riga Ghetto.

The camp site was prepared in October 1941 by Soviet prisoners of war from the Salaspils branch camp Stalag 350/Z of the Riga of base camp 350 and by deported Czech Jews as well as a few German Jews from KZ Jungfernhof. In the middle of January 1942 at least 1,000 Jews from the Riga Ghetto were forced to work building the camp. Insufficient accommodation and sanitary conditions, lack of nutrition and severe cold weather caused an extraordinarily high number of deaths.

The Nazis had planned to deport the last remaining Jews from Germany by the end of the summer of 1942. To support this, the plans for the Salaspils camp were revised in an effort to allow the camp to accommodate 15,000 Jews deported from Germany. The camp by then played three roles, general police prison, later the security police prisoner camp, and then a forced labor camp. However the last expansion plan was not carried out.

In the autumn of 1942 the camp comprised 15 barracks of the 45 that were planned, housing 1,800 prisoners. Although a police prison and work education camp, Salaspils became comparable to a German concentration camp in the way the work was organized, the types of prisoners, as well as their treatment, as they recounted later.

By the end of 1942 the Salaspils camp held mainly political prisoners (who had originally been incarcerated at the Riga central prison without due process under "protective custody orders") and interned foreigners such as Latvian returnees from Russia, whom the Nazis considered politically suspect. Furthermore, work education prisoners and recruits to local Latvian collaboration units (Schutzmannschaften) who had committed routine crimes. There were only twelve Jews in the camp; many had died or been returned to Riga in a weak condition.

Children in Salaspils
Typhoid fever, measles and other diseases killed about half of the children at the camp.<ref>  Vestermanis, Marģers  Die nationalsozialistischen Haftstätten und Todeslager im okkupierten Lettland 1941-1945 (The National Socialist Detention Places and Death Camps in Occupied Latvia 1941-1945), p. 478-479, published in  Herbert, Ulrich and others (Hrsg): Die nationalsozialistischen Konzentrationslager, Band 1 (The National Socialist concentration camps, volume 1), Frankfurt/M 2002, </ref> In one of the burial places by the camp, 632 corpses of children of ages 5 to 9 were revealed.

Numbers of victims
About 12,000 prisoners went through the camp during its existence. About 2,000 people died due to illness, heavy labour, executions, epidemics, etc.

Later history
Starting in 1949 legal proceedings were brought against some of the persons responsible for the Nazi crimes in Latvia, including the Riga Ghetto, and the Jungfernhof and Salaspils concentration camps. Some accused were condemned to life imprisonment. Gerhard Kurt Maywald is one such Nazi, convicted of crimes committed in the camp.

Memorial of the Salaspils police prison

In 1967 a Memorial of the Salaspils Police Prison was established in Salaspils, which included an exhibit room, several sculptures and a large marble block by architects Gunārs Asaris, in 2004, thanks to a donation by Larry Pik, a former prisoner at the Salaspils concentration camp, a separate monument to commemorate foreign Jews who died there was erected. The monument bears the Star of David and an inscription in Hebrew, Latvian and German: “To honour the dead and as a warning to the living. In memory of the Jews deported from Germany, Austria and Czechia, who from December 1941 to June 1942 died from hunger, cold and inhumanity and have found eternal rest in the Salaspils forest”.

During the time of the Soviet Union, the Russian group "Singing Guitars" dedicated a song "Salaspils" to the children's camp.

 See also 
 
 The Holocaust
 The Holocaust in Latvia
 List of books about Nazi Germany
 List of Nazi-German concentration camps
 Nazi concentration camps
 Gulags
 Nazi Party
 Nazi songs
 World War II

 References 

  Angrick, Andrej and Klein, Peter, "Endlösung" in Riga. Ausbeutung und Vernichtung 1941–1944 ("Final solution" in Riga. Exploitation and destruction 1941-1944''). Darmstadt 2006, 
  "Латвия под игом нацизма" (dt.: "Latvia under the yoke of the Nazism", English: "Latvia Under the Nazi Yoke"), Moscow, publishing house Europe, 2006, 344 S.: Collection of historical documents.
  Людмила Тимощенко. «Дети и война» (dt.: "Children and War"), Daugavpils, publishing house SIA "SAB", 1999: 494 pages. 3000 copies. (Documentary narrative about 1300 children and teenagers, who were Salaspils - prisoners of Salaspils camp.)

External links
 
 Catalog of Pins and Medals Commemorating the Salaspils Concentration Camp

Nazi concentration camps in Latvia
1941 in Latvia
Einsatzgruppen
Reich Security Main Office
Generalbezirk Lettland